WIAM-LP (101.1 FM, "The Way") is a radio station broadcasting a religious format. Licensed to serve Knoxville, Tennessee, United States, the station is owned by Calvary Chapel of Knoxville.

References

External links

 

IAM-LP
IAM-LP
IAM-LP
Calvary Chapel Association